Kabul, City in the Wind is a 2018 internationally co-produced documentary film directed by Aboozar Amini. In July 2019, it was shortlisted as one of the nine films in contention to be the Dutch entry for the Academy Award for Best International Feature Film at the 92nd Academy Awards, but it was not selected.

References

External links
 

2018 films
2018 documentary films
Dutch documentary films
2010s Persian-language films